Ezequiel Padilla Peñaloza (December 31, 1890 – September 6, 1971) was a Mexican statesman. Born in Coyuca de Catalán, Guerrero, he served in the Senate, as Attorney General in 1928, as Secretary of Education from 1928 to 1930, as ambassador to Hungary from 1930 to 1932, and as Secretary of Foreign Affairs from 1940 to 1945. He was the President of the Chamber of Deputies in 1925.

His appointment to the Secretariat of Foreign Affairs by President Manuel Ávila Camacho marked an end to the Post-Revolutionary domination of politicians from the North of the country. With his co-cabinet member Miguel Alemán Valdés (Secretary of the Interior), he "gave Mexico the most progressive foreign policy and the most orderly internal government in the nation's history." By 1941, he had successfully settled all foreign claims against the government stemming from the Cárdenas-era expropriations. He negotiated a favorable economic treaty, fixed the peso to the United States dollar, and secured loans for industrial development from the Export-Import Bank of the United States.

During World War II, he was a strong proponent of inter-American unity and led conferences of the foreign ministers of countries of the Americas to this end. He was criticized by some for being too pro-American.

He emerged alongside Alemán as a prime contender for the presidency in 1946. He was better-known abroad than his rival, and was considered to have stronger tendencies toward democracy. However, his association with the United States made him unpopular in the left wing of the Institutional Revolutionary Party (PRI), and Alemán won the party's nomination. He ran as an independent candidate for the presidency in 1946, receiving 443,537 votes. Though Alemán received over three times the number of votes, Padilla's total was respectable, considering the PRI's hegemony at the time. Also, the fact that he was not exiled after the campaign is considered something of a victory for Mexican democracy, which had been intolerant of opposition parties and candidates since solidification of the PRI.

References

1890 births
1971 deaths
National Action Party (Mexico) politicians
Presidents of the Chamber of Deputies (Mexico)
Candidates in the 1946 Mexican presidential election
Mexican Secretaries of Education
Mexican Secretaries of Foreign Affairs
People from Guerrero
Ambassadors of Mexico to Hungary
Attorneys general of Mexico